Nicolls is a surname, and may refer to

 Edward Nicolls, officer in the Royal Marines
 Edward Hugh Dyneley Nicolls, engineer and British colonial official
 Richard Nicolls, the first English colonial governor of New York

Surnames from given names